Prof Alexander Robert Horne  FRSE OBE MIME PRSSA (1881–1953) was a Scottish engineer and author.

Life
He was born in Leven, Fife in 1881. He was educated at George Heriot's School in Edinburgh.

He was apprenticed as an engineer to James Milne & Sons Ltd of Milton House Works in the Canongate  in Edinburgh probably around 1896. He then went t the University of London to formally train as an engineer.

In 1910 he obtained a post as Professor of Engineering at Robert Gordons College in Aberdeen, aged only 29. Here he lived at 374 Great Western Road in Aberdeen. In 1920 he was elected a Fellow of the Royal Society of Edinburgh. His proposers were Sir Thomas Hudson Beare, Richard Stanfield, George Adam Smith and John Taylor Ewen.

In 1929 he moved to Heriot Watt University as Professor of Mechanical Engineering and stayed there until retiral in 1945.

He died in Edinburgh on 17 May 1953.

Positions of Note

President of the Royal Scottish Society of Arts
President of the Aberdeen Association of Civil Engineers

Publications

This Modern World and the Engineer (1934) co-written with Charles Galton Darwin
The Age of Machinery
The Story of the Orkney and Zetland Association 1896–1946

Family

He was married to Nina Helena Horne. They had a son Edward A Horne.

References

1881 births
1953 deaths
People from Leven, Fife
Alumni of the University of London
Scottish mechanical engineers
Fellows of the Royal Society of Edinburgh
People educated at George Heriot's School